Events during the year 1938 in  Northern Ireland.

Incumbents
 Governor - 	 The Duke of Abercorn 
 Prime Minister - James Craig

Events
16 March – Belfast Harbour Airport at Sydenham is opened, with the inaugural commercial flight to Glasgow.
17 March – British Royal Navy cruiser  is launched at the Harland and Wolff shipyard in Belfast.
24 May – The new Anti-Partition Party takes eight seats in a Unionist-controlled Londonderry Corporation.

Arts and literature
 April – Louis MacNeice publishes I Crossed the Minch and his poetry The Earth Compels.

Sport

Football
Irish League
Winners: Belfast Celtic

Irish Cup
Winners: Belfast Celtic 2 - 0 Bangor

Births
20 January – Derek Dougan, footballer (died 2007).
21 January – Ken Maginnis, Baron Maginnis of Drumglass, Ulster Unionist Party politician.
16 February – Sammy Chapman, footballer and football manager.
17 March – Keith Michael Patrick O'Brien, Archbishop of Saint Andrews and Edinburgh (died 2018 in Scotland.
3 April – Raymond Hunter, cricketer and rugby player (died 2020).
7 May – John Caldwell, boxer.
26 May – May Blood, Baroness Blood, community activist.
1 June – Desmond Boyd, community activist.
19 June – John Sheil, lawyer and judge.
25 July – Ken Kirkpatrick, cricketer.
28 August – Dick Creith, motorcycle road racer.

Deaths
12 December – James McNeill, politician and second Governor-General of the Irish Free State (born 1869).

See also
1938 in Scotland
1938 in Wales

References